Pruning is the practice of removing unwanted portions from a plant.

Pruning may also refer to:

 Synaptic pruning, the reformation of neural structure by pruning "excess" neurons or neural clusters
 Decision tree pruning, a method of simplification of a decision tree
 Pruning (morphology), a technique used in digital image processing based on mathematical morphology
 Pruning (viticulture), how pruning is used in vine training systems
 Pruning (vascular), in prenatal development, the disappearance of blood vessels which are no longer needed
 Pruning (microeconomics), the removal of "excess" items from a budget
 Pruning (maceration), in dermatology, the softening, whitening, and wrinkling of skin that is soaked in water
 Retinal vessels pruning, the disappearance of the ends of the small vessels in the area affected (as in case of retinal venous occlusion)